Argyrotaenia quercifoliana, the yellow-winged oak leafroller moth, is a species of moth of the family Tortricidae. It is found in eastern North America.

The wingspan is 16–24  mm. Adults have pale yellowish-cream forewings with golden-brown speckling and brown, oblique lines. There is a hollow circle pattern in the subterminal area. The hindwings are white with yellow shading in the lower half. Adults are on wing from May to July.

The larvae feed on Hamamelis, Quercus (oak), and possibly Rhamnus (buckthorn) species.

References

External links
Moth photographers group: Argyrotaenia quercifoliana

Q
Moths of North America
Fauna of the Eastern United States
Moths described in 1858
Taxa named by Asa Fitch